D314 branches off to the south from D2 between Čačinci and Feričanci towards the city of Orahovica.

The road, as well as all other state roads in Croatia, is managed and maintained by Hrvatske ceste, state owned company.

Road junctions and populated areas

Sources

State roads in Croatia
Virovitica-Podravina County